Reza Hassanzadeh may refer to:
 Reza Hassanzadeh (Esteghlal, footballer) (born 1964), retired Iranian football player
 Reza Hassanzadeh (Tractor, footballer) (died 2006), Iranian football player